Legden (Westphalian: Ledden) is a municipality in the district of Borken, in North Rhine-Westphalia, Germany. It is located between Ahaus and Coesfeld.

References

Borken (district)